Gordonia neofelifaecis is a bacterium from the genus Gordonia which has been isolated from faeces from the leopard (Neofelis nebulosa) in the Sichuan Province in China.

References

Further reading

External links
Type strain of Gordonia neofelifaecis at BacDive -  the Bacterial Diversity Metadatabase

Mycobacteriales
Bacteria described in 2011